Kristi Achor Pursell (born February 9, 1981) is an American politician serving in the Minnesota House of Representatives since 2023. A member of the Minnesota Democratic–Farmer–Labor Party (DFL), Pursell represents District 58A in southern Minnesota, which includes the city of Northfield and parts of Dakota, Rice, and Scott Counties.

Early life, education and career 
Pursell graduated from Saint Olaf College with a bachelor's degree in English and environmental studies. She also received a graduate certificate in environmental education from the University of Minnesota Duluth.

Pursell served five years as the Executive Director of Clean River Partners, an environmental non-profit organization based in Northfield, Minnesota. She also has been a leader within grassroots organizations, including the Land Stewardship Project, ISAIAH MN, and TakeAction MN.

Minnesota House of Representatives 
Pursell was first elected to the Minnesota House of Representatives in 2022, after redistricting and the retirement of DFL incumbent Todd Lippert. Pursell serves as vice-chair of the Agriculture Finance and Policy Committee and sits on the Elections Finance and Policy, Environment and Natural Resources Finance and Policy, and Education Finance Committees.

Electoral history

Personal life 
Pursell lives in Northfield, Minnesota with her husband, Michael, and their two children.

References

External links 

Living people
Democratic Party members of the Minnesota House of Representatives
1981 births